The Egremont Russet is a cultivar of dessert apple, of the russet type. It has a rich, nutty flavour and crisp, firm and fairly juicy flesh.

It was first recorded in 1872, and is believed to have been raised by the Earl of Egremont at Petworth in Sussex, UK.

It was first popular in the Victorian era and has remained popular ever since. It is the third most common apple in commercial cultivation in England & Wales after Cox's Orange Pippin and Bramley, although its 308ha represents just 3.7% of total apple orchards.

It is a popular garden apple in the United Kingdom (UK) and trees are widely available from UK garden centres.

References

General information and image
  National Fruit Collection page NFC reference 1979-159
reference for Lord Egremont (pdf)

British apples